European Journal of Prosthodontics and Restorative Dentistry is a peer-reviewed medical journal published by Dennis Barber. It was established in 1992 with Paul S. Wright as its founding editor-in-chief. The current editor is Will Palin (Birmingham University). The journal is abstracted and indexed in MEDLINE/PubMed.

References

External links 
 

Publications established in 1992
Quarterly journals
English-language journals
Dentistry journals